Zwan was an American alternative rock supergroup that was formed by Billy Corgan and Jimmy Chamberlin, lead singer/guitarist and drummer of The Smashing Pumpkins respectively, after they disbanded in December 2000. Other members included bassist Paz Lenchantin, of A Perfect Circle, and guitarists David Pajo, of Slint, and Matt Sweeney of various prior bands and projects. The band released only one album, Mary Star of the Sea, in 2003, before breaking up acrimoniously that same year during their world tour to promote the album. Following the disbanding, Corgan released a solo album, TheFutureEmbrace before reforming the Smashing Pumpkins in 2005, with Chamberlin in 2006. Despite allusions to multiple albums' worth of material written by band members, no further material has surfaced beyond their only studio album, and none of the material has ever been revisited in performances by any of the members outside of a brief 2017 tour by Corgan.  In his solo shows in the summer of 2019, Corgan played "Honestly" and "Endless Summer" on his European summer tour at some dates.

History

Formation and Mary Star of the Sea (2001-2003)
Following the breakup of the Smashing Pumpkins, Corgan and drummer Jimmy Chamberlin joined forces with Matt Sweeney (formerly of the bands Chavez and Skunk) to start Zwan. Corgan had been friends with Sweeney since early in his career and Sweeney was thanked in the liner notes to The Smashing Pumpkins album Siamese Dream. 
Juan Alderete was one of the musicians who auditioned for the bassist position, before Sweeney recruited David Pajo (member of Slint, Papa M, Stereolab and many Drag City acts). The band debuted as a four-piece in late 2001. Later, former A Perfect Circle bassist Paz Lenchantin joined the band in 2002, and Pajo was moved to third guitarist.

Zwan had two different incarnations. The first, and more common version, the True Poets of Zwan (or simply "Zwan"), used three guitars, bass guitar and drums. Zwan's only album, Mary Star of the Sea, is attributed to the True Poets of Zwan in the liner notes. Zwan is credited with being a bridge between the success of the Smashing Pumpkins in the 1990s and the further career developments and experimentations undertaken by Corgan in the 2000s, as well as his shift from his sombre, dark themes towards more hopeful lyrics in line with his spiritual development at the time.

Djali Zwan, an acoustic incarnation of Zwan, which also featured cellist Ana Lenchantin, Paz's sister, was to film and record the making of a new album in the studio in the fall of 2003, with an album and DVD to be issued in early 2004. Corgan spoke with Rolling Stone about his plans: "We're going to do it Let It Be-style," Corgan said, referring to the documentary about the 1970 Beatles album. "The album would be recorded live, with the cameras rolling. When you get the DVD, you can watch the takes on the album being done." He described the songs he'd written for Djali Zwan as "more folk-driven, rooted in traditional music. I don't want to compromise veins of material to fit into an electric band, which I often did in the Pumpkins. With Djali Zwan, I can write an acoustic song and not worry how it's going to stand up against some rock epic."

Billy Corgan, Linda Strawberry, and Matt Sweeney came together to create the soundtrack for the movie Spun, directed by Jonas Åkerlund, and were credited as The Djali Zwan.

Break-up (2003)
Billy Corgan announced the band had broken up on Chicago's WGN, on September 15, 2003. "I really enjoyed my experience with Zwan, but at the end of the day, without that sense of deeper family loyalty, it just becomes like anything else," Corgan said.

On April 24, 2005, in the Chicago Tribune, Corgan commented briefly on the breakup of the band: "The music wasn't the big problem, it was more their attitude... Sex acts between band members in public. People carrying drugs across borders. Pajo sleeping with the producer's girlfriend while we were making the record."

In the May 27, 2005 edition of Entertainment Weekly, Corgan elaborated on his version of what went wrong:

Corgan also stated that he can no longer listen to Mary Star of the Sea, because to him it sounds like "thousands of lies upon lies upon lies. It's a shame because there's tons of music unreleased that will just sit in a box until I can stomach it." When asked which of his two former bands would ever reform, he said, "Pumpkins. You'll never see Zwan. I'll never go anywhere near those people. Ever. I mean, I detest them. You can put that in capital letters. Bad people. James and D'arcy are good people. They might be misguided people, but they're good people."

A decade after Zwan's demise, Corgan's stance would soften regarding performance of its material. He included Zwan songs in a set of mostly Smashing Pumpkins material during a solo show in August 2014, and the following year announced a Smashing Pumpkins acoustic tour that would also incorporate Zwan material in its sets. Zwan songs were also featured in Corgan's tour to support his 2017 solo album, Ogilala.

Matt Sweeney, who initiated the band with Corgan, said in 2017, "We had a friendship from before he was famous. One on one, we had a pretty great thing going. We had a great year where we made like a hundred songs. Nobody’s ever heard that stuff. But once it went public, everything was different. I was confused, it started to feel like fulfilling a commitment where the game had changed. It was interesting, I’m still sort of unpacking that experience. We all had to sign confidentiality agreements, so I can’t really talk about it." David Pajo was also still negative about the band as of 2017.

Musical style
Zwan's debut and only album was described as "an efficient exercise in the kind of American alternative rock with big choruses that makes the boys at the front jump up and down." The band's style is mostly pop-orientated and closer to mainstream pop rock, evoking "the candied pop that characterised much of the Pumpkins' later work." Nevertheless, the songs also contrast with late Pumpkins material, being described as a "bright blast of tuneful guitar rock, as effervescent as the late Pumpkins material was gloomy." In addition to being considered as power pop, the band's work also features guitarist David Pajo's post-rock textures.

Band members
Jimmy Chamberlin – drums (2001–2003)
Billy Corgan – guitar, lead vocals (2001–2003)
Paz Lenchantin – bass guitar, backing vocals (2002–2003)
David Pajo – bass guitar (2001–2002), guitar (2002–2003)
Matt Sweeney – guitar, backing vocals (2001–2003)

Discography

Studio albums

Singles

References

External links
 
 Zwan collection at the Internet Archive's live music archive

American alternative rock groups
Musical groups established in 2001
Musical groups disestablished in 2003
Musical quintets
Rock music supergroups
American pop rock music groups
American power pop groups
Billy Corgan